Janelle "Penny" Commissiong, TC (born June 15, 1953) is a Trinidadian politician, model and beauty queen who was crowned Miss Universe 1977.

Biography

She studied at Bishop Anstey High School. migrated to the United States at the age of 13, and returned to Trinidad and Tobago ten years later. After winning the Miss Trinidad and Tobago Universe title, she went on to be crowned Miss Universe 1977 in Santo Domingo, Dominican Republic and in the process became the first black woman to win the prestigious pageant crown. After winning the title, she was most commonly known as 'Penny' because she was small as a penny.

In New York City, she studied fashion at the Fashion Institute of Technology, but returned to Port of Spain in 1976. The following year, Commissiong was selected to represent the country at the 1977 Miss Universe competition in Santo Domingo, Dominican Republic.

She was elected Miss Photogenic four days before the final, becoming the first black woman to win these awards in Miss Universe history. On July 16, in the National Theater of Santo Domingo, Commissiong was crowned Miss Universe, attracting international attention as the first black winner in the chronology of Miss Universe.

During her reign, she was an advocate for black rights and world peace. Commissiong was awarded the Trinity Cross, the country's highest award, in 1977. Three postage stamps were also issued in her honour. In 2017, Queen Street located in the capital of Port of Spain, was renamed to Queen Janelle Commissiong Street in tribute of her 1977 Miss Universe win.

Commissiong was named chair of the newly formed Tourism Trinidad Destination Management Company in October 2017. From 2012 to 2015 she had served as vice-chair of its predecessor agency, the Tourism Development Company.

She married Brian Bowen, founder of Bowen Marine, who died in an accident in November 1989. After his death, she married businessman Alwin Chow.

See also

 Giselle LaRonde
 Wendy Fitzwilliam

References

 Janelle Commissiong at bestoftrinidad.com
 The Penny that didn't drop - biography at nalis.gov.tt

1953 births
Fashion Institute of Technology alumni
Living people
Miss Universe 1977 contestants
Miss Universe winners
Recipients of the Trinity Cross
Trinidad and Tobago beauty pageant winners
Trinidad and Tobago female models